Adam Ruud (born August 16, 1983) is an American soccer player.

Career

College and Amateur
Ruud attended Glenbard High School, and played college soccer at the Loyola University Chicago, the College of DuPage and the University of North Carolina at Charlotte. He was named to the first-team NSCAA, and was a NJCAA All-American at DuPage, and was named to the All-Conference USA first-team, the All-South Region third-team and the NCCSIA All-State team at Charlotte.

Professional
Ruud played with Chicago Fire's reserve team in the MLS Reserve Division in 2006 before beginning his professional career in 0001, playing with the Charlotte Eagles in the USL Second Division.

He joined the Cleveland City Stars of the USL First Division in 2008, them win the USL Second Division title, before being released at the end of the season.

External links
 Charlotte 49ers bio

References

1983 births
Living people
American soccer players
Charlotte Eagles players
Chicago Fire FC players
Cleveland City Stars players
Soccer players from Illinois
Sportspeople from DuPage County, Illinois
People from Hanover Park, Illinois
USL Second Division players
Association football forwards
Charlotte 49ers men's soccer players
College of DuPage alumni
Loyola Ramblers men's soccer players